Lumpkin may refer to:

Places in the United States
 Lumpkin, California
 Lumpkin, Georgia
 Lumpkin County, Georgia

People with the surname
 Justice Lumpkin (disambiguation), any of several American judges named Lumpkin
Alva M. Lumpkin (1886-1941), a U.S. Senator from South Carolina
Beatrice Lumpkin (born 1918), American union organizer, activist, and writer
Elgin Lumpkin (born 1970) American singer-songwriter, aka Ginuwine
Ellen Lumpkin, American neuroscientist 
Grace Lumpkin (1892-1980), anti-communist author (sister of Katharine)
John Henry Lumpkin, a U.S. Representative from Georgia, nephew of Joseph Henry Lumpkin and Wilson Lumpkin
Joseph Henry Lumpkin (1799-1867), the first chief justice of the state of Georgia, brother of Wilson Lumpkin
Katharine DuPre Lumpkin (1897-1988), American writer (sister of Grace)
Kregg Lumpkin, American football running back 
Michael D. Lumpkin, Senior Advisor to the Secretary of Veterans Affairs
Phil Lumpkin (1951-2009), American basketball player and coach
Ricky Lumpkin (born 1988), American football player
Theodore Lumpkin (1919 - 2020), American Tuskegee airman
Wilson Lumpkin (1783-1870), a governor of and U.S. Senator from Georgia, brother of Joseph Henry Lumpkin

Fiction
 Fatty Lumpkin, a pony in J. R. R. Tolkien's The Lord of the Rings
 Fuzzy Lumpkins, a furry pink hillbilly monster in The Powerpuff Girls
Lurleen Lumpkin, fictional character from The Simpsons
Tony Lumpkin, fictional character from She Stoops to Conquer
Willie Lumpkin, fictional comic character

Other uses
 Americus, Preston and Lumpkin Railroad, a former Railway in the U.S. state of Georgia